This article lists the main weightlifting events and their results for 2020.

2020 Summer Olympics (Weightlifting)

2020 Summer Paralympics (Powerlifting)

World weightlifting championships and cups
 January 27 – 31: Roma 2020 World Cup in  Rome
 March 14 – 21: 2020 IWF World Junior Weightlifting Championships in  Bucharest
 October 20 – 24: 2020 FISU World University Weightlifting Championships in  Gangjin
 November 11 – 18: 2020 IWF World Youth Weightlifting Championships in  Lima

Continental and regional weightlifting championships
 February 13 – 19: 2020 Asian Junior & Youth Weightlifting Championships in  Tashkent
 February 25 – 29: 2020 West Asian Weightlifting Championships in  Dubai
 February 27 – March 3: 2020 East Asian Weightlifting Championships in  Seoul (debut event)
 March 18 – 23: 2020 South American, Ibero-American & OPEN Senior Weightlifting Championships in  Cali
 April 4 – 12: 2020 European Weightlifting Championships in  Moscow
 April 13 – 20: 2020 African Weightlifting Championships in  Côte d'Or
 April 16 – 25: 2020 Asian Weightlifting Championships in  Nur-Sultan
 April 17 – 24: 2020 Pan American Weightlifting Championships in  Santo Domingo
 September 10 – 20: 2020 European Junior & U23 Weightlifting Championships in  Rovaniemi

References

External links
 International Weightlifting Federation Website

 
2020 sport-related lists
Weightlifting by year